Alice Marie Drakoules (other married name Lewis;  – 15 January 1933) was a British humanitarian, vegetarian and campaigner for animal welfare.

Life
Drakoules was born near Brussels to English parents, in about 1850. In 1876, she married William Lewis who was the managing director of the Union Assurance Company. In 1887, she founded a Band of Mercy in Weybridge. In 1891, the Humanitarian League was founded by Henry Stephens Salt with her support. The League's first meeting was held at her house and established her as the treasurer. She was not considered to have been a great talker or writer, but was recognized as an unfailing organiser.

The Animal Defence and Anti-Vivisection Society was formed in 1906 and its executive council included Drakoules. She was a keen supporter of the society, helping it campaign for licensed slaughterhouses, humane slaughter and for an end to performing animals. Her husband died in 1907, leaving her with an adopted son. Her second husband, Platon Eustathios Drakoules (or Drakoulis), was a Greek socialist, ex-member of the Greek Parliament. They shared a common interest in humanitarianism. The Humanitarian League ended in 1919, but out of its end was formed, with her support, what was to become the League Against Cruel Sports.

Drakoules died in the area known as Regent's Park, in 1933.

Legacy 
Four years after Drakoules' death, her friends arranged for a monument to be constructed in St John's Wood churchyard, which includes a wide range of sculpted animals.

See also
 List of animal rights advocates

References

1850s births
1933 deaths
Activists from Brussels
Anti-vivisectionists
British animal welfare workers
British humanitarians
British vegetarianism activists
British women activists